The Buffon Islands are a group of three adjoining, rocky islands, together about  in extent, lying  east of Petrel Island in the Geologie Archipelago. They were charted in 1951 by the French Antarctic Expedition and named by them for Georges Buffon, a noted French naturalist.

See also 
 List of Antarctic and sub-Antarctic islands

References 

Islands of Adélie Land